Plymouth Plantation may refer to:
 Plimoth Patuxet a living museum in Plymouth, Massachusetts, formerly known as Plimoth Plantation
 Plymouth Colony (sometimes New Plymouth) the English colonial venture in North America from 1620 - 1691
 Of Plymouth Plantation, book by William Bradford